A List of baritone horn, euphonium, tenor horn, tenor tuba and marching baritone horn manufacturers past and present. Most of these companies produce or produced tenor brass as part of an overall band instrument catalogue.

Active manufacturers
Adams Musical Instruments, a Dutch manufacturer of percussion instruments that recently started making brass instruments
Alexander Musical Instruments, a 7th generation family owned manufacturer of traditional European baritones and Tubas as well as other brass (est. 1782).
AMATI Kraslice, Czech wind instrument company 
Besson, a subsidiary of Buffet, manufactures tenor brass in Germany, France and India
Červený, Czech brass instrument company; subsidiary of Geneva Instruments
Conn-Selmer manufactures tenor brass under the historic C.G. Conn and King Musical Instruments names at multiple facilities in the United States
E.K. Blessing, a subsidiary of Powell flutes, manufactures marching baritones in the United States
Eastman Music Company, Makes String, Brass, Woodwind and a variety of other instruments
F.E. Olds, manufactures tenor brass under the names of the previously defunct American companies F.E. Olds and Reynolds
Hirsbrunner, manufactures tenor brass in Switzerland
Jupiter Band Instruments, is the US subsidiary of KHS Musical Instruments Co., Ltd, which manufactures tenor brass in Asia.
Meinl-Weston, a family and employee owned Low Brass manufacturer has produced tenor brass since 1810 in Bohemia and Germany.
Miraphone, a German manufacturer of tenor and low brass instruments.
Sterling Instruments, a British manufacturer of tenor brass.
Taishan, a Chinese manufacturer of brass instruments (Shan Dong Taishan).
Weril Instrumentos Musicais, one of the most traditional brass manufacturers in the world, an Austrian family stablished in Brazil in 1909.
Willson Instruments, a manufacturer of Brass Band instruments, particularly Tuba and Euphonium (no baritones)
Yamaha Musical Instruments, a division of Yamaha corporation, manufactures tenor brass in Japan and markets/supports through subsidiaries in other nations including the United States

Historic manufacturers

John Lathrop Allen, a Massachusetts firm that built tenor brass including the oldest known side lever action rotary instrument (a baritone), in the 1840s and 50s.
Graves and Co., a Boston Massachusetts firm that built tenor brass ancestors of baritone and tenor horns before 1869
E.G. Wright and Company, a Boston Massachusetts firm that built tenor brass from 1841 to 1869
Boston Musical Instrument Company, incorporated as the Boston Musical Instrument Manufactury as a merger of Graves & Co. and E.G. Wright, built tenor brass from 1869 to 1928
Hall Instrument Company, established 1862, merged with Quinby Brothers to form
Quinby and Hall Band Instruments, established 1866, which became
Hall, Quinby and Wright Company in 1870 with the brief partnership of E.G. Wright (d. 1871), transitioning the company to
Hall and Quinby, until Hall left the company creating
Kanstul Musical Instruments, Founded in 1981 by the late Zig Kanstul, makes an extensive line of brass instruments including historic replicas as well as production for other brands in Anaheim California.
Quinby Brothers, established 1876, which was purchased by Thomson and Odell to form
The Standard Band Instrument Company, established 1884, which was ultimately bought by guitar company
The Vega Company which manufactured brass instruments from 1909 to 1939.
V.F. Cerveney, a Bohemian brass instrument maker established in 1845 and absorbed into the Czech national socialist instrument cooperative after WWII following the expulsion of the ethnic German craftspeople of the region. The name is now utilized by Amati-Kraslice (Kraslice being formerly the Bohemian town of Grazlitz) which emerged as the private identity of the former state cooperative.
H.N. White, the makers of “King” musical instruments in Ohio from 1893 to 1965, which after several mergers and acquisitions still exists as a brand of Conn-Selmer
C.G. Conn, the original instrument firm founded by Colonel Charles Gerhard Conn in 1879 (mouthpiece company founded in 1874). Conn sold out in 1915 and the company and name have transformed through many mergers, and sales ultimately becoming a brand of Conn-Selmer
York Band Instrument Company, founded by James Warren York, manufactured tenor brass and mouthpieces for them from 1883 to 1917. Alternate names included Smith & York, York & Holton and York & Sons.
Frank Holton & Company, founded in 1896, is still an active brand of Leblanc, but no longer manufactures tenor brass such as the “Falcone Model” baritone of the late 70s.
Buescher Band Instrument Company manufactured tenor brass in Elkhart Indiana from 1894 – until being sold to Selmer (now Conn-Selmer) in 1963.
Seidel Band Instrument Company manufactured tenor brass from 1914 to 1918 when it was bought by
E.A. Couturier which manufactured mostly Couturier’s patented cornets, but also tenor brass from 1918 until 1923 when Couturier lost his eyesight and the company, the assets of which were bought by
Lyon & Healy, which manufactured tenor brass from 1923 until halting instrument production in 1929.
Distin & Co which made brass instruments in London from 1849 until 1868 when it was sold toBoosey & Company (established before 1851) manufactured tenor brass from 1868 until its merger withHawkes & Son, established 1865, which createdBoosey and Hawkes which manufactured tenor brass in England and France from 1930 until instrument production was halted by a succession of sales and financial problems in 2003.F.E. Olds manufactured tenor brass from 1910 until ceasing operations in 1978 with an auction of all assets.Vincent Bach Corporation''' while founded to manufacture trumpets and similar brass instruments, in the later twentieth century, during part of a progression of changes in ownership, did manufacture baritones. As a brand of Conn-Selmer, the Bach name is no longer found on tenor brass (with the exception that Bach does produce tenor trombones).

Sources
The summary notes in this list are taken from the Wikipedia pages referenced within except as noted below.

External links

Euphonium, baritone horn and tenor horn